Takam Pario Tagar is an Indian politician serving as the Leader of Opposition in  Arunachal Pradesh Legislative Assembly. His real name is Takam Tagar but is affectionately called Pario. He won the 2009 elections on a PPA ticket to switch to Indian National Congress and won the 2014 elections on an Indian National Congress ticket and later switched to PPA to switch back to Congress again and is currently a member of Indian National Congress.

Takam Pario was elected unopposed from Palin constituency in the 2014 Arunachal Pradesh Legislative Assembly election, standing as an INC candidate.

On 30 December 2016, Pema Khandu was suspended from the primary membership of the People's Party of Arunachal by the party president and Takam Pario was named as the next likely Chief Minister of Arunachal Pradesh replacing Pema Khandu after Pema Khandu was suspended along with 6 other MLAs.
For the assembly elections held in 2009 and 2014, Takam Pario stood as the richest candidate for election to the Arunachal Pradesh Legislative Assembly with  assets worth 200 crores.

See also
 Arunachal Pradesh Legislative Assembly

References

External links
Takam Tagar Janta Pratinidhi profile
MyNeta Profile

People's Party of Arunachal politicians
Indian National Congress politicians
Living people
Arunachal Pradesh MLAs 2009–2014
Arunachal Pradesh MLAs 2014–2019
People from Kra Daadi district
Year of birth missing (living people)